The Sand Castle (French: Le château de sable) is a 1977 stop motion animated short by Co Hoedeman. Winner of the Academy Award for Best Animated Short Film at the 50th Academy Awards, the film was produced by Gaston Sarault for the National Film Board of Canada. The film was created with sand animation and sand-covered foam rubber puppets.

Plot

The plot of the film follows a humanoid sand person who creates living creatures from sand in a desert of some unknown location. He then initiates a plan: that they create a sand castle for them to reside in. With each other's help, the sand castle is eventually completed and the sand characters celebrate. The celebration is cut shortly when wind begins to blow and covers up the sand castle, with the sand characters retreating inside for safety. The viewer may possibly assume that, once the wind dies down, the characters would eventually resurface and start over again and that this cycle could continue endlessly.

Production
The film had a budget of $82,783.

Accolades
The film received twenty-two awards, including the Academy Award for Best Animated Short Film, making it the most awarded film made by the National Film Board of Canada at that point.

References

Works cited

External links
Watch The Sand Castle at NFB.ca
 

1977 films
Animated films without speech
1977 animated films
1970s animated short films
Best Animated Short Academy Award winners
Films scored by Normand Roger
Films shot in Montreal
National Film Board of Canada animated short films
Quebec films
Sand animated films
Stop-motion animated short films
1977 short films
1970s stop-motion animated films
Films set in deserts
1970s Canadian films